The Molde River is a river in Molde Municipality in Møre og Romsdal county, Norway. Its origins are found at Lake Molde. It follows the Molde Valley on its way to the Molde Fjord. The approximately  river is crossed by several bridges.

Although the river is minor and seasonal, there were several sawmills along its course in the 17th and 18th centuries. This gave rise to the city itself through a combination of a good harbour, proximity to the sea routes, vast timber resources, and a river capable of supporting mills.

In 1909, the river also housed the first hydroelectric power plant capable of providing sufficient electricity to the city. Much of the drinking water for the city comes from the upper part of the river.  During the reconstruction after the fire of 1916, the lower part of the river and the estuary is controlled by a dam, built just north of the city, which also serves as a reservoir and water supply reserve.

See also
List of rivers in Norway

References

Rivers of Møre og Romsdal
Molde
Rivers of Norway